Occupy Democrats is an American left-wing media outlet built around a Facebook page and corresponding website. Established in 2012, it publishes false information, hyperpartisan content, and clickbait. Posts originating from the Occupy Democrats Facebook page are among the most widely shared political content on Facebook.

History
Occupy Democrats was established as a Facebook page in 2012 by Rafael and Omar Rivero. A corresponding website was later created. Its stated objective is to provide a "counterbalance to the Republican Tea Party".

In September 2022, Occupy Democrats was accused of having raised almost $800,000 for its election fund and donating none of the money to federal candidates, and of donating $250,000 from the fund to Blue Deal LLC, a company that was allegedly women-owned but was actually owned by Rafael Rivero. In fact, Blue Deal LLC is a company that was formed in Florida in 2014 by Rafael and Omar Rivero, while The Blue Deal LLC is a 100% women-owned company that was formed in Virginia in 2010. The Blue Deal LLC is not related in any way to Blue Deal LLC, Occupy Democrats, or the Rivero brothers. In response to the accusations, Omar Rivero claimed that the fund operated as a super PAC and was barred from donating directly to candidates, and that none of the money given to Blue Deal LLC had gone to him or Rafael. Axios journalist Lachlan Markay said that the election fund was actually a hybrid PAC and thus could donate to political candidates.

Influence
In a 2017 feature on partisan news, BuzzFeed News analyzed weekly Facebook engagements "since the beginning of 2015 and found that Occupy Democrats on the left and Fox News on the right are the top pages in each political category." The article added that the pages "consistently generate more total engagement than the pages of major media outlets."

Occupy Democrats was named the "Most Influential Progressive Facebook Page" by CrowdTangle in 2015 and by 2017 surpassed 7 million followers. During the year 2017, Occupy Democrats was among the 30 sources most frequently shared on Facebook. In May 2020, almost half of the 40 top-performing videos that mentioned "Trump" on Facebook originated from Occupy Democrats. As of October 2022, Occupy Democrats had 10 million followers on Facebook and over 498,000 followers on Twitter.

In a paper presented at the 52nd Hawaii International Conference on System Sciences, Argha Ray and Joey George concluded that disinformation propagated by Occupy Democrats "has the potential to further deepen the cracks in an already divided society".

2016 U.S presidential election
The organization received wide attention during the 2016 presidential primaries of the Democratic Party, and was credited for having helped build support for Bernie Sanders' candidacy. The site shifted its support to Hillary Clinton, following her nomination as Democratic Party presidential candidate.

2020 U.S. presidential election
According to Rafael Rivero, he was "plugged in" with the Joe Biden 2020 presidential campaign and the campaign worked directly with the outlet to disseminate political messaging. In October 2020, Occupy Democrats experienced a significant drop in its reach on Facebook, which Rivero attributed to action taken by Facebook to throttle traffic, a claim Facebook denied.

Biden Administration
During the presidency of Joe Biden, White House Chief of Staff Ron Klain gave his first interview following the 2022 State of the Union Address on a Twitter Spaces live chat hosted by Occupy Democrats.

Content

Subject matter
Occupy Democrats posts memes and content primarily about United States politics. Its content is hyperpartisan, left-oriented and built around clickbait and hyperbole. Comments to posts shared on Occupy Democrats tend to be hallmarked by "greater anger and incivility" than those of mainstream media Facebook pages and groups.

Accuracy

Evaluation by academia
In 2017, the Asan Institute for Policy Studies said that Occupy Democrats "share[s] both real and fake news ... further blurring the line between fact and fiction". Some scientific studies have identified Occupy Democrats as a fake news website.

According to the University of Iowa library, Occupy Democrats "has been known to show misleading, fake, or exaggerated partisan content". The Valencia College library includes Occupy Democrats on a list of sources that "cannot usually be accepted at face value and need further verification from other sources to determine if information is credible". In a 2017 poster session developed by the library staff of the University of California at Merced, Occupy Democrats was rated "questionable" for its factual reporting and was noted for "not having a very good fact check record".

Evaluation by media
Occupy Democrats has repeatedly been caught by fact-checking websites for posting "exaggerated or invented news stories." Brooke Binkowski, a managing editor at Snopes, commented that  Occupy Democrats' headlines were often "extremely misleading."

According to The Atlantic, Occupy Democrats' posts are "studded with straightforwardly fake news". The Los Angeles Weekly reports that its posts are "free from the constraints of objectivity and, in some cases, facts". A 2016 BuzzFeed News analysis found it was "the least accurate left-wing page" of several Facebook pages it reviewed and cited one instance where it published a satirical story as fact. In the run-up to the 2020 U.S. presidential election, The New York Times reported that Occupy Democrats "twisted facts to push a critical narrative about Republicans".

In 2017, PolitiFact included Occupy Democrats in its list of fake news websites. However, PolitiFact later removed Occupy Democrats from its list of fake news sites and, according to the Miami New Times, "admitted Occupy Democrats should never have been on the list in the first place." As of December 2020, PolitiFact classified 62% of 16 posts shared by Occupy Democrats it had evaluated as "not accurate". A further 31% it considered "half-true".

In 2021, a post shared by Occupy Democrats claimed Nikki Haley had changed her first name to sound more "white" in order to further her political career. A fact check column by USA Today reported that Nikki was her legal middle name, she had used it as a given name since childhood, and that it was of ethnic Punjabi origin. The same year, Snopes rated "False" a claim by Occupy Democrats that "Republican Congress members had abjectly failed to applaud Biden’s stated goal of drastically reducing the rate of child poverty in the United States" during that year's State of the Union address.

In April 2022, Occupy Democrats claimed that U.S. Senate candidate Josh Mandel had posted to social media a manipulated photo of himself showing his head on the body of a Black woman. The Mandel campaign claimed the assertion was "totally false," independent experts were unable to find signs of manipulation in the image, and PolitiFact rated the claim as "unproven" and "false".

In July 2022, Occupy Democrats posted a photo of Ginni Thomas holding a bottle of wine along with a false caption that the photo was a recent one and showed her celebrating the U.S. Supreme Court's decision in Dobbs v. Jackson Women's Health Organization, though the photo actually predated the decision by several years. The following month, the Associated Press reported that Occupy Democrats "misinterpreted the content of ... [a] Pentagon [press] release" to incorrectly claim that United States President Joe Biden would "not recognize any anti-abortion laws enacted by states" in relation to U.S. Supreme Court decision in Dobbs v. Jackson Women's Health Organization.

Popular perception
In a 2017 survey among US readers, Occupy Democrats was voted the "least trusted news source" among American readers, just below Breitbart News and BuzzFeed. In September 2018, the English Wikipedia deprecated Occupy Democrats as a source due to its unreliability. In an October 2018 Simmons Research survey of 38 news organizations, Occupy Democrats was ranked the third least-trusted news organization by Americans, underneath Breitbart News, the Daily Kos and the Palmer Report, with InfoWars and The Daily Caller being lower-ranked.

References

External links 
 
 Occupy Democrats's file at PolitiFacts
 Posts related to Occupy Democrats at Snopes.com

American news websites
Fake news websites
Internet properties established in 2012
Left-wing politics in the United States
Progressivism in the United States
Far-left politics in the United States